The initialism LGBT is used to refer collectively to lesbian, gay, bisexual, and transgender (LGBT) people and members of the specific group and to the community (subculture) that surrounds them. This can include rights advocates, artists, authors, etc.

In spite of considerable de jure legal protection for the LGBT community  in Colombia (see LGBT rights in Colombia), LGBT individuals are often subject to controversy regarding acceptance (transgender individuals, in particular).

Statistics
There are no complete statistical studies on the number of gay, lesbian, bisexual or transgender people in Colombia.

In August 2020, questions about sexual orientation and gender identity were included in the National Poll on Consumption of Psychoactive Substances (Encuesta Nacional de Consumo de Sustancias Psicoactivas, or ENCSPA). Because of the privacy level of this particular poll (it was given to randomly selected households and filled out by only one person in the household), it was considered a good opportunity for questions about LGBT identity. The results were that 98.78% of respondents identified as heterosexual, while the remaining 1.22% were gay, lesbian, bisexual, or other. Additionally, 51.86% identified as women and 48.07% as men, while the remaining 0.05% were transgender and 0.02% were other. A spokesperson for the human rights organization Dejusticia said these numbers appear very low compared to studies in other countries and may be skewed by the respondents' fear of discrimination.

LGBT history
 
1513: Spanish conquistador Vasco Núñez de Balboa killed a group of Native Americans with his dogs near the Darién Gap, who were said to be homosexuals.
1514: One of the first books written about the Americas, Historia General y Natural de las Indias reports that homosexuality was fairly common in the territory of what is today Colombia
1610: The opening of the Spanish Inquisition tribunal in Cartagena. The tribunal has autonomy to apply the death penalty in cases of sodomy.
19th and early 20th centuries: Treatments supposed to cure homosexuality were applied, such as electroshock, hormones and monkey testicle xenotransplantation.
1970s: In Medellín, a group of gay men led by León Zuleta started the first Colombian gay association (Zuleta was killed due to related causes in 1993)
1974: The American Psychiatric Association removed the homosexuality from the Diagnostic and Statistical Manual of Mental Disorders, (DSM), its list of mental diseases. The national government, however did not adopt this standard and still classified homosexuality as a mental illness in the national disease codification CIE for several more years.
1976: The MLHC (Movimiento de Liberación Homosexual de Colombia- Colombia's Homosexual Liberation Movement), is founded in Bogotá by Manuel Velandia Mora, based on León Zuleta's idea, who had edited the first issue of "El Otro" magazine, in Medellín.
1981: Homosexuality is declared legal by the Colombian government. (Prior to this year, homosexuality was considered a crime and punished with 5 to 15 years jail time)
1982: The first gay pride parade was celebrated in Bogotá, with about 32 people marching. A contingent of nearly a hundred policemen were sent for crowd control. 
1983: The first official reports of AIDS-related deaths in Colombia. The GAI Help and Information on AIDS Group (GAI Grupo de ayuda e Informacion sobre SIDA) is founded by Manuel Velandia and Eduardo Moreno.
1986-1989: Groups of illegal anti-gay social cleansing were formed around the country to take actions against the LGBT community.  The media reported a rising bigotry and  about 640 related murders during this period. Some groups that attributed themselves the crimes were "Manonegra" (black hand), "Amor a Medellín" (love to Medellín), "Amor a Manizales" (love to Manizales) and "muerte a HOMOSEXUALES" (death to homosexuals).
1990: Manuel Velandia promoted the recognition of equal rights for HIV/AIDS-infected people.
1991-1994: Reports of the media about several episodes of gay bashing against people leaving places suspected of being gay nightclubs in Bogotá, who were stripped, soaked with cold water and left in the top of Monserrate hill.
1994: The first support groups for HIV/AIDS were created.
1996: The first organized lesbian groups were created.
1995: Psychologist Marina Talero created the first support groups for transgender people.
During the early 2000s, the Colombian lawyer and LGBT Activist German Perfetti won legal actions for the achievement of important issues such as: social security for same-sex couples, the right to work for gay teachers, protection against unjustified job loss for LGBT–related causes, and the right to legal name change for transgender people.
2000: The first National LGBT Convention was celebrated in Bogotá.
2001: Creation of Planeta Paz (the Planet Peace Project)  for bisexual visibility.
2002: May 1. A hand grenade was thrown against Manuel Velandia´s house, in the West Chapinero neighborhood of Bogota. Velandia was at the time running campaign for Chamber of Representatives of Colombia in representation of the Liberal Party and the sexual minorities.
2007: January 17.  Manuel Velandia left the country and headed to San Sebastián, Spain, asking for Right to asylum with the aid of the Spanish Red Cross, The Spanish Commission of help for refugees (CEAR) and the GEHITU (LGBT association of the Basque Country). His case was finally presented to the provincial commissary of police on February, 2007.
7 February 2007: Colombian Constitutional Court recognizes proprietary equity (inheritance) rights for same-sex couples having lived together for more than 2 years and registered as a union in a public notary, thanks to the efforts of the public interest law group of Universidad de los Andes.
March 2007: The president of the Catholic Bishop council, Pedro Rubiano, together with other ecclesiastic authorities, made press statements against the recognition of same-sex couples by the national government.
June 2007: The Colombian Congress, in the final stage of recognition of same-sex couples, decided to discard the project
5 October 2007: The Colombian Constitutional Court rules that same-sex couples registered as a couple in a public notary must be granted the same social security (health care) benefits as those given to heterosexual couples.
12 November 2007: The LGBT community center of Chapinero was closed for a month due to bureaucratic issues and lack of funds
December 2007: Several transvestites murdered in Bogota's Santafé neighborhood. Reports of at least one million pesos (about 500 dollars) being paid in exchange for each murder.
17 April 2008: The Colombian Constitutional Court rules that same-sex couples registered as a couple in a public notary must be granted the same pension benefits as those given to heterosexual couples. This ruling, together with the ruling of 7 February 2007 on property rights (inheritance) and  the ruling of 5 October 2007 on social security means Colombian same-sex couples have the same rights as heterosexual couples.
27 January 2009: the Colombian Constitutional Court makes a general revision of the National Constitution in order to provide equality between same-sex civil unions and heterosexual ones. Also, in order to correct every single article where homosexual people and couple would be under discrimination.
8 April 2010: The office of asylum and refugees, of the General Direction of Interior Politics of the Spanish Ministry of Interior recognized Manuel Antonio Velandia Mora with the condition of refugee and the right of asylum.
26 July 2011: Same-sex Couples are recognized as a form of Family, Constitutional Court ruled that those families need a contract that solemnize their bond and asked National Congress to legislate in order to protect same-sex couples before 20 June 2013. If Congress fails to do so, same-sex couples may go to judges and notaries to register their union with the solemnity of Marriage.
5 November 2015: Same-sex couples allowed to adopt children, Colombia’s constitutional court ruled that adoption agencies could not discriminate against LGBT couples during an adoption process.
2018: Colombia prosecuted a transgender woman's murder as a femicide for the first time in 2018, sentencing Davinson Stiven Erazo Sánchez to twenty years in a psychiatric center for "aggravated femicide" a year after he killed Anyela Ramos Claros, a transgender woman.

LGBT rights in Colombia

As mentioned on OutinColombia.com, Colombia is a progressive nation in terms of LGBT equality.  According to Colombia Diversa's website and news reports, Colombia’s gay-friendly policies grant the following rights to LGBT people:

Marriage Equality: Colombia’s Constitutional Court ruled that gays and lesbians cannot be denied the freedom to marry, with the first wedding taking place in 2016.

Adoption: Colombia’s courts ruled in 2015 that gay and lesbian couples have the right to adopt, ruling that barring gay people from adopting had unreasonably deprived children of the right to be raised by families.

Free from discrimination in the workplace and places of public accommodations: It is a crime to discriminate based on sexual orientation or gender identity.
Colombia has even made the very act of kissing in public a protected right.

Immigration Equality: Gay and lesbian Colombians can sponsor their same-sex partners or spouses to obtain residency.

Social Security and Health Benefits: Even before marriage equality was recognized, Colombia granted health and social security benefits, including survivor benefits, to same-sex couples.

Organizations

There are about 20 registered LGBT organizations in Colombia. Among others: 
Colombia Diversa Organization
Lesbian Organizations:  "DeGeneres-E", "Triangulo Negro" ( Black Triangle), "Lesbic Collective" and "Mujeres al Borde" ( Women to the Edge)
Lambda project:  HIV/AIDS- related
"Círculo LGBT Uniandino", Universidad de los Andes
"Stonewall Javeriano", Student group by Pontificia Universidad Javeriana - Vicerrectoría del Medio Universitario - Asistencia para el fomento de Grupos Estudiantiles
Grupo estudiantil UDiversia, Universidad Distrital
TRANS-SER Red de Apoyo a Transgeneristas

Events
Flower Power is a party held every Sunday before a Monday bank holiday in an upscale location in the north of Bogota. Some of its proceedings go to LGBT-related projects.
Sungay Party is a charity event to raise funds for LGBT-related projects.
Gay Pride Day:  28 June, with parades in the main cities of the country.

Del Mismo Modo, En el Sentido Contrario, Party from Círculo LGBT Uniandino.
Fiesta Glitter. party from Stonewall Javeriano.
Guacherna Gay at Barranquilla's Carnival.

Gay villages 

Most of the LGBT-friendly places (nightclubs, bars, gay bath houses, etc.) in Bogotá are concentrated in the Chapinero area, including the only LGBT Community Center in the country, which opened in September 2006, and is sponsored by the Office of the Mayor of Bogotá.  See also Zona Rosa de Bogotá.

Literature

Alonso Sanchez Baute: Al Diablo la Maldita Primavera (To Hell with the Goddamn Spring).  (also adapted to theater). He also wrote "Libranos del bien".
Fernando Molano Vargas: Un beso de Dick (Dick's Kiss), Vista desde una acera (View from a sidewalk), Todas mis cosas en tus bolsillos (All my things in your pockets).
Fernando Vallejo: Our Lady of the Assassins (novel) (also adapted to film), El Desbarrancadero (The Precipice), El Rio del Tiempo (River of Time), Los Caminos a Roma (Roads to Rome) among others.
Porfirio Barba-Jacob
Luis Fayad: Los parientes de Esther (Esther's relatives)
Ruben Velez: Veinticinco centímetros (25 centimetres), dec. 1997 published by W. C. Editores
 Juliana Delgado Lopera: Fiebre Tropical

Art
"Muro de recuperación de la memoria trans" is a mural containing 39 photos of transgender murder victims in Colombia. The mural was installed in 2020 in the Centro de Atención Integral para la Diversidad Sexual y de Género in the Los Mártires locality of Bogotá.

Media
Miau Colombia: Miau Underground Collective. the first online LGTB television show in Colombia.
Bogotárosa: Webportal, dedicated to LGBT community in Bogotá, Metro area and Colombia. News, guide, movies, music and general entertainment.
 "EL OTRO" (1970) published by León Zuleta was the first gay  publication released in a regular basis  in the country.
Indetectable
RumbaG portal
Nemesis times magazine

Nightclubs

Theatron: Located in Bogotá, is considered the largest gay nightclub in Latin America
Medellín nightclubs: Feathers-Splash
In Barranquilla Studio 54 and Sky Bar among other baths, videos and so on.

Resources
Colombia LGBT: On-line guide to gay resources all over the country

See also
LGBT in Argentina
LGBT in Chile
LGBT in Mexico

References

External links
Colombia LGBT 
LGBT Uniandino 
DeGeneres-E 
Mujeres Al Borde, Women on the Edge